Irish Seed Savers Association (ISSA) is an Irish non-governmental organisation founded in 1991. The Irish Seed Savers Association maintains a seed bank with over 600 non-commercially available varieties of seed.

Aims and Tasks 
The Irish Seed Savers Association aims to:

 Protect, conserve and utilise Irish plant genetic resources including rare heritage seeds, grains, vegetables and fruit.
 Promote agricultural biodiversity for food security.
 Educate the public on agricultural biodiversity and food security through information and workshops
 Research seed, grain, vegetable and fruit varieties suited to Ireland's temperate maritime climate.

With its projects the Irish Seed Savers Association found and saved over 140 different types of Irish apple trees and 25 native Irish grains. The Irish Seed Savers Association has a ten-acre site with purpose built facilities, native woodland and an apple orchard/nursery. Irish Seed Savers Association is a network partner of the European SAVE Foundation. Irish Seed Savers are also a member of the Irish Environmental Network.

See also 
 SAVE Foundation (Safeguard for Agricultural Varieties in Europe)
 Semperviva
 ProSpecieRara
 Arca-Net

References

External links 
 Irish Seed Savers Association

Agricultural organisations based in Ireland
Sustainable agriculture
1991 establishments in Ireland